The University of South Australia (UniSA) is a public research university in the Australian state of South Australia. It is a founding member of the Australian Technology Network of universities, and is the largest university in South Australia with approximately 37,000 students.

The university was founded in its current form in 1991 with the merger of the South Australian Institute of Technology (SAIT, established in 1889 as the South Australian School of Mines and Industries) and the South Australian College of Advanced Education (SACAE, established 1856). The legislation to establish and name the new University of South Australia was introduced by the Hon Mike Rann MP, Minister of Employment and Further Education. Under the University's Act, its original mission was "to preserve, extend and disseminate knowledge through teaching, research, scholarship and consultancy, and to provide educational programs that will enhance the diverse cultural life of the wider community".

UniSA is among the world's top newer universities, ranked in the World's Top 50 Under 50 (universities which are under 50 years old) by both the Quacarelli Symonds (QS) World University Ranking (#29) and Times Higher Education (THE) (#46). It has two Adelaide city centre campuses, two Adelaide metropolitan campuses, and two South Australian regional campuses.

History

UniSA was formed in 1991 by the merger of the South Australian Institute of Technology with three South Australian College of Advanced Education campuses. To the former SACAE campuses of Magill, Salisbury, and Underdale, SAIT added its three campuses at City East, The Levels (now called Mawson Lakes) and Whyalla. The two other SACAE campuses, City (adjacent to University of Adelaide), and Sturt (in Bedford Park, adjacent to Flinders University), were later merged into their nearby universities.

School of Arts
The South Australian School of Arts can trace its history back to 1856 and the work of Charles Hill and H. P. Gill, and connected to the South Australian School of Design. As such, it can claim to be one of the oldest art schools in Australia, and the oldest public art school. The school, now within UniSA's Division of Education, Arts and Social Sciences, is also known for providing a visual arts scholarship, the Ann & Gordon Samstag Scholarship.

SACAE
The South Australian College of Advanced Education (SACAE) was formed in 1982 with the merger of five Colleges of Advanced Education (CAE). Adelaide, Hartley, Salisbury, Sturt, and Torrens CAEs became the Adelaide, Magill, Salisbury, Sturt, and Underdale campuses of the SACAE.

The CAE themselves were formed from various teachers' colleges in 1973.
Adelaide CAE developed from Adelaide Teachers' College (est. 1921), which had its roots in a training school established in 1876.
Murray Park CAE originated from Wattle Park Teachers College, which branched off from Adelaide Teachers College in 1957.
Torrens CAE had its origins in the South Australian School of Arts, which dates back to 1856, and in Western Teachers College, which branched off from Adelaide Teachers College in 1962.
Kingston CAE developed from the Adelaide Kindergarten Teachers College (est. 1967), which had its roots in a kindergarten training centre established in 1907.
Sturt CAE was originally Bedford Park Teachers College (est. 1966).
Salisbury CAE was originally Salisbury Teachers College (est. 1968).
In 1979 Hartley CAE was formed from the merger of Murray Park CAE and Kingston CAE.

SAIT

The South Australian Institute of Technology traced its origins back to 1889 when the South Australian School of Mines and Industries established on the corner of North Terrace and Frome Road between the University of Adelaide and the Royal Adelaide Hospital. The building, towards which Sir George Brookman was a significant contributor, was from 1918 to 1960 the home of Adelaide Technical High School. In 1960 it became the South Australian Institute of Technology (SAIT) and Adelaide Technical High School moved to Glenunga to become Glenunga High. The SAIT was made up of three campuses, all of which remain a part of the University of South Australia. In 1965 SAIT was designated a college of advanced education resulting in a broadening in the range of courses offered, particularly at the professional level. Under a government reform to education in 1991 it was given the option of merging with the newly formed TAFE SA or the SACAE to form the University of South Australia. SAIT was an educational institution with 3 campuses in suburban Adelaide, and had a broad range of topics making it a clear fit with neither institution, though SACAE was chosen in the end.

21st century
Shortly after the merger, Salisbury campus was vacated in 1996, given its proximity of the nearby Levels campus, but its sale was held up for many years by litigation. In 1997, a new campus was opened at City West with schools from Underdale being relocated there. In 2005, the campus at Underdale was closed as part of the Blueprint 2005 project, and its remaining programs were moved to other campuses.

In 2013, the university released the 2013–2018 Strategic Plan named "Crossing The Horizon", shaping the future actions of the university nationally and internationally. As part of the plan, the university committed to differentiate itself as Australia's University of Enterprise and to focus its activities on end-user needs. In 2014 the first building in a major new infrastructure plan to support those goals was opened. Named in recognition of the great Australian artist and UniSA alumnus, the Jeffrey Smart Building houses the UniSA Library and a host of student services. In 2018 two new buildings were opened; the new Great Hall, named Pridham Hall after a generous benefaction from a UniSA alumnus Andrew Pridham, and the University of South Australia Cancer Research Institute which houses the Centre for Cancer Biology (an alliance between UniSA and SA Health), the research-rich School of Pharmacy and Medical Sciences, UniSA's technology-based business incubation hub, the Innovation and Collaboration Centre and a new and unique future-focused public museum, #MOD.

In June 2018, the university, along with University of Adelaide, launched official talks of a possible merger. The proposition was endorsed by Steven Marshall and Simon Birmingham, but the merger was called off in October 2018. In 2022, the topic of a merger was raised again by the new government led by Peter Malinauskas, which proposed setting up a commission to investigate the possibility of a merger of UniSA, Adelaide and Flinders University. Staff's opinions were evenly divided on the idea of a commission.

In 2021, the university celebrated its 30th birthday.

Campuses
There are two campuses in the Adelaide city centre (both on North Terrace), two metropolitan campuses (at Mawson Lakes, formerly The Levels, and Magill), and two campuses in regional South Australia, (Whyalla and Mount Gambier). The University of South Australia also runs offshore degree programs in collaboration with private institutions in Hong Kong Baptist University and other higher education institutions throughout Asia.

City East

Located on the corner of North Terrace and Frome Road, adjacent to the University of Adelaide, on the site of the former South Australian Institute of Technology, and before that, the School of Mines. 
The campus has undergone several building upgrades and expansions in recent years. The Basil Hetzel Building was opened in 2005 and includes 2,000 square metres of multipurpose biomechanical, pharmaceutical and microbiological laboratory space. There was a major reconstruction to the historic School of Mines building in 2008–09 to include a new outdoor plaza, a new exercise physiology clinic, outdoor walkways, student lounges and other upgrades.

City West
Located on the corner of North Terrace and Morphett Street (in the city), the City West Campus is located between North Terrace and Hindley Street in buildings constructed in the 1990s for the new campus.

New building was also undertaken as part of a $167 million six-year asset plan known as Blueprint 2005, including the A$35 million Hawke building, named in honour of former Prime Minister of Australia Bob Hawke and opened in 2007. The Hawke Building houses the second largest public art gallery in the state of South Australia, the Anne and Gordon Samstag Museum of Art. It also includes the Kerry Packer Civic Gallery, (purpose-built for exhibitions relating to culture, history and social debate), the Allan Scott Auditorium, the Hawke Prime Ministerial Library, and Australia's only architecture museum. Officially named The Bob Hawke Prime Ministerial Centre, the building is known as the Hawke Centre, and is hosts many events, both within the building and at other venues.

The Blueprint project included the construction of six major buildings, extensions and upgrades across UniSA's six campuses and featured the Dorrit Black and Kaurna buildings completed in 2005 at City West, the South Australian School of Art, and the Louis Laybourne Smith School of Architecture and Design.

In 2014 the University opened a new learning centre, the Jeffrey Smart Building, on the City West campus. Also on the City West campus are the new Pridham Hall featuring a sports complex, swimming pool and facilities for graduations, exams, corporate and cultural events which opened in 2018 and the new UniSA Cancer Research Institute, part of the biomedical and health precinct being developed on North Terrace. The building, also opened in 2018, houses the university's Museum of Discovery (MOD).

Magill

Magill Campus is located on St. Bernard's Road at Magill. It currently focuses on a range of education, humanities and social science disciplines, including psychology, social work, communication and media, public relations, journalism, and the study of creative industries.

Mawson Lakes
Mawson Lakes (formerly The Levels) currently houses computing and information technology, engineering, science, civil aviation, applied science, sports science, e-commerce and environmental studies programs. The campus also houses many research institutes and centres, including the Future Industries Institute (FII) which conducts industry-connected research in engineering and the physical sciences. The campus also houses a number of industry collaborations within the space and defence industries.

Whyalla
Programs offered at Whyalla include nursing, social work, early childhood and primary teaching, engineering and community wellbeing as well as a Foundation Studies program.

Mount Gambier
Based in the Limestone Coast region of southeast South Australia, UniSA's Mount Gambier Campus opened in 2005, and provides for country-based students and researchers. Mount Gambier offers students undergraduate programs in nursing, social work, primary and early childhood education, and UniSA Foundation Studies, which prepares students for tertiary education.
In 2016 the Mount Gambier Learning Centre was officially opened.

Organisation and governance

Governance

Chancellery

Academic profile

Rankings and achievements

The University of South Australia's academic structure consists of seven Academic Units:

UniSA Allied Health & Human Performance

UniSA Clinical & Health Sciences

UniSA Business

UniSA Creative

UniSA Education Futures

UniSA Justice & Society

UniSA STEM

The University of South Australia is ranked within the top 300 universities worldwide by the QS World University Rankings and 251-300th ranking bracket by the 2020 Times Higher Education World University Rankings. UniSA Business School is fully accredited by EQUIS, which accredited fewer than 200 universities worldwide. In 2015 in the Excellence in Research for Australia rankings, 97% of UniSA's research was rated at world class or above. In 2018, this was upgraded to 100% of UniSA's research at or above world class.

Research Institutes
The University of South Australia is home to three institutes:
 Future Industries Institute (FII)
 The Ehrenberg-Bass Institute for Marketing Science and
 The Centre for Cancer Biology

Affiliations
Australian Technology Network (ATN)
Open Universities Australia
Australian Vice-Chancellors' Committee (AVCC)
Association of Commonwealth Universities (ACU)
Engineers Australia

Student life

Associations

University of South Australia Students Association (USASA, formerly UniLife) is a democratic organisation run by students. USASA provides administrative support to over 100 sporting and social clubs, a range of events throughout the year and free advocacy and advice services, and also produces the UniSA student magazine Verse Magazine.

After the passing of the voluntary student unionism legislation the activities and collective voice of students was significantly diminished. However this has spurred the student association to work hard to offer students better value for money.

Sports
UniSA Sport, which manages the sporting life of students at the university, organises and facilitates the development of sport clubs and activities on campuses. UniSA sport teams participate annually in both national and regional intercollegiate competitions such as the Australian University Games as well as the Southern University Games between Victorian, Tasmanian and South Australian universities.

MOD.

MOD. (Museum of Discovery) is described as "a futuristic museum of discovery". Its seven gallery spaces spread over two levels showcase science in a series of annually changing exhibits. One major unchanging exhibit is the Universal Gallery, featuring "Science on a Sphere", which shows planetary data on a sphere, with the surrounding walls being touchscreens which can be used to transform the planets, sun or moon. Other galleries include the Lecture Gallery, the Street Gallery, the Arcade Gallery, the Gould Interactive Gallery and the Futures Gallery.

Aimed at inspiring young adults' interest in science, MOD. is free to visit in the Health Innovation Building (UniSA Cancer Research Institute) or Bradley Building (Purruna Wardli), on North Terrace. The museum has won a number of awards for its interior design, exhibitions and events since 2018, and has been used as a venue for Adelaide Fringe events.

Selected exhibits

2022: Ngapulara Ngarngarnyi Wirra (Adnyamathanha for "Our Family Tree") is an art installation commissioned by MOD. and created by  UNSW technologist Angie Abdilla, artist Baden Pailthorpe and former AFL player Adam Goodes, in a project named the Tracker Data Project. The tree refers to a 500-year-old sacred red river gum, or wirra, that lives on Adnyamathanha land. The installation is based on computerised biometric  data gathered by the AFL via a small device worn on Goodes' back when playing football over the years. Sounds were created by an algorithm that mixes recordings of the wind and Goodes' voice speaking in the Adnyamathanha language with his performance data, while a 3D scan of the wirra and Goodes' data were combined in a point cloud, resembling stars in the sky.

Events

The UniSA Nelson Mandela Lecture series is an annual event presented by The Bob Hawke Prime Ministerial Centre. Established in 2008 to honour the South African President Nelson Mandela, who served as the Hawke Centre's first international patron from 2001 to 2013, the address has been given almost every year since its establishment. Past speakers include:
 2008: Musimbi Kanyoro
 2009: Unity Dow
 2010: Ashis Nandy
 2012: Eyal Weizman    
 2014: Mary McAleese
 2015: Hilary Charlesworth
 2016: Geraldine Cox 
 2017: Geoffrey Robertson QC and Michael Kirby 
 2018: Ronni Kahn
 2019: Sally Rugg
 2022: Craig Foster  (20 April 2022)

Notable alumni

Arts
Andrew Baines, artist
Beverley Bolin, architect 
David Caon, industrial designer 
Angelica Cheung Editor-in-chief, Vogue China
D. M. Cornish, author
Barbara Hanrahan, artist, printmaker and writer
Peter Serwan, artist
Jeffrey Smart AO, artist, studied at the South Australian School of Art and Crafts circa 1940
Poh Ling Yeow, artist, celebrity chef, television presenter

Business
Rob Chapman, company director
Essington Lewis, Chairman, BHP
Andrew Pridham, company director
Philip Sims, CEO, South Australian based Robern Menz Manufacturing Pty Ltd
Alexandrea Cannon, Chair, Credit Union SA
Dr Mark Ahn, President and CEO, and Director, Galena Biopharma
Dr Chitra Rajaram, Senior Vice President Vasantham Channel, Mediacorp
Dr Nalaka Godahewa, Chairman, Securities & Exchange Commission of Sri Lanka

Human rights
 Tom Calma AO, social justice campaigner
 Andrea Mason, CEO NPY Women's Council

Journalism and media
Phillip Coorey, journalist
Sarah Cumming, former Seven News presenter and reporter
Georgina McGuinness, former weekend anchor and reporter for National Nine News. (Alumna of SACAE, Magill campus, graduated 1987)
Rebecca Morse, Ten News presenter, former ABC reporter and presenter, and South Australian Media Awards Journalist of the Year in 2005
Kate Collins, Nine News presenter,
Will McDonald, Nine News reporter
Indira Naidoo, consumer rights advocate and former television news presenter (ABC and SBS). (Alumna of SACAE)
Sally Sara AM, ABC TV journalist and correspondent

Sports

Eleni Glouftsis OAM,  Australian rules football field umpire in the Australian Football League (AFL)
John Gloster, physiotherapist for the Indian Cricket Team
Isabella Rositano, multi-sport athlete
Rachael Sporn OAM, Olympic basketballer Atlanta 1996, Sydney 2000, Athens 2004
Darryl Wakelin, AFL footballer 
Jenny Williams, multi-sport athlete

Politics
Dean Brown AO former Premier of South Australia
Robert Lau Hoi Chew (1942–2010), Malaysian Member of Parliament, and Deputy Minister of Transportation of Malaysia
Lina Chiam, Non-Constituency Member of Parliament, Singapore
Nick Champion, ALP member of the South Australian House of Assembly representing the Electoral district of Taylor since 2022
Bob Day, former Family First Senator for South Australia
Glenn Docherty, Mayor of the City of Playford
Trish Draper, former Liberal member of the Australian House of Representatives, representing the Division of Makin
Iain Evans, former Leader of the Liberal Party in South Australia and former Leader of the Opposition in the South Australian parliament (Alumnus of SAIT)
Tom Kenyon, ALP Former member of the Parliament of South Australia representing the Electoral district of Newland
Michelle Lensink MLC, Deputy Leader of Liberal in the South Australian Legislative Council
Steven Marshall, former Premier of South Australia, former Leader of the Liberal Party in South Australia, and member representing the Electoral district of Dunstan
Tony Messner, former Liberal Senator for South Australia and federal Minister for Veterans Affairs
Mark Parnell, former SA Greens member of the Parliament of South Australia
Christopher Pyne, former Liberal member of the Australian House of Representatives, representing the Division of Sturt, and former Minister for Defence
Trish White, former ALP member of the Parliament of South Australia representing the Electoral district of Taylor from 1994-2010
Dana Wortley, ALP member of the Australian Senate
Penny Wong, Leader of the Government in the Senate and Minister for Foreign Affairs

Honorary awards

Doctor of the University
The university awards the Honorary Doctorate to recognise an individual who has achieved eminence in an area of education or research, or is distinguished by eminent service to the community.

The honorary doctorate is not a recognised qualification and as such the title 'Doctor' is not used by recipients, but the Post-nominal letters "DUniv" is granted.

Recipients

Startup incubator 

The Innovation Collaboration Centre is UniSA's startup incubator. The incubator provides the Venture Catalyst and Venture Catalyst Space program for students and the community to build early-stage startup company. The incubator offers office space, mentoring, access to industry experts, workshops, university resources and funding to companies accepted into the program.

See also

List of universities in Australia

References

External links

 

 
Universities in South Australia
Education in Adelaide
Nursing schools in Australia
Educational institutions established in 1991
Australian vocational education and training providers
Australian Technology Network
1991 establishments in Australia